North Carolina Highway 161 (NC 161) is a primary state highway in the U.S. state of North Carolina that connects the city of Kings Mountain, North Carolina to Bessemer City, North Carolina and York, South Carolina.

Route description

History
The first NC 161 was established in 1930 as a new primary routing from Warrensville to the Virginia state line, in Ashe County. In 1937 it was renumbered as NC 162 (and is currently NC 194).

The second and current NC 161 was established in 1937 as a renumbering of NC 215 to match SC 161; it ran from the South Carolina state line to U.S. Route 29 (US 29) and US 74 (now US 74 Business) in Kings Mountain. In 1939, the highway was extended northeast to NC 274 Bessemer City replacing US 29A/US 74A.

Junction list

References

External links

161
Transportation in Cleveland County, North Carolina
Transportation in Gaston County, North Carolina